Gary Alexis Medel Soto (born 3 August 1987) is a Chilean professional footballer who plays for Italian club Bologna and the Chile national team as a centre-back and a defensive midfielder. Medel has played club football with several teams in numerous countries, starting out with Chilean side Universidad Católica, and later playing for Argentine side Boca Juniors, Spanish side Sevilla, Premier League side Cardiff City, and Italian side Inter Milan, before moving to Beşiktaş in Turkey in 2017. He then moved back to Italy and joined Bologna in 2019.

A full Chilean international with over 150 caps since 2007, Medel has represented the nation at two FIFA World Cups, five Copa América tournaments, and one edition of the FIFA Confederations Cup. He was part of the squad that won the 2015 Copa América (where he was named in the Team of the tournament) and the Copa América Centenario. He was also included in the squads that finished fourth at the 2019 Copa América, and were runners-up at the 2017 Confederations Cup.

Club career

Early career in South America
Medel joined Universidad Católica at the age of 12. His youth team coach Mario Lepe put his name forward to join the senior ranks.

On 20 July 2009, he joined Boca Juniors on an initial loan for US$300,000 with the option to buy for $2.5 million, with Damián Díaz being sent in the opposite direction. Medel said of the move "This is a dream come true. It is a very important club, and one which has players which I admire a lot, Juan Román Riquelme, Martín Palermo and Sebastián Battaglia. He is my idol and has me very happy to play by his side". Medel scored both goals in a 2–0 win in the Superclásico against River Plate on 25 March 2010.

Before he joined Sevilla, his farewell match with Boca was a friendly against River in Mar del Plata. He came on in the 77th minute of the 2–0 win.

Sevilla

Medel joined Sevilla for €3 million on 28 January 2011, on a -year contract, on the same day as the club also signed Ivan Rakitić for their central midfield. He said "I am happy to be here, I hope that everything goes well. I'm a player who puts a lot into my heart on the pitch, I hope that with my playing that I can contribute to Sevilla".

On 12 February, he made his La Liga debut, playing all 90 minutes of a 2–3 away defeat at Racing Santander. He helped Sevilla to a 1–1 draw against FC Barcelona at home on 12 March, clearing the ball off the line twice, the second on an attempt by Lionel Messi.

Cardiff City
On 11 August 2013, Cardiff City confirmed that they had signed Medel from Sevilla for a club record £11 million fee on a four-year deal. He made his debut for the club on 17 August, in a 2–0 defeat against West Ham United. He made his home debut at the Cardiff City Stadium on 25 August, in a 3–2 win against Manchester City. Medel played all 90 minutes and received the fans' man of the match award.

Inter Milan
After Cardiff's relegation, Medel joined Italian club Inter Milan for a reported £10 million fee on 9 August 2014. The fee, which was £1 million less than what Cardiff had signed Medel for, was criticised by former striker Nathan Blake, but was justified by Cardiff manager Ole Gunnar Solskjær. Medel made his Serie A debut for Inter on 31 August as they began the season with a goalless draw at Torino, playing the full 90 minutes.

On 31 October 2015, Medel scored his first goal for Inter to give the Nerazzurri a 1–0 victory over Scudetto rivals Roma at the Stadio Giuseppe Meazza.

On 23 October 2016, in the 2–1 away defeat at Atalanta, Medel hit Jasmin Kurtić in the face with his left arm, an incident that was not spotted by the referee. A day later, however, he was banned for three league games by Lega Serie A after examining TV images.

On 20 November 2016, in the Derby della Madonnina against cross-town rivals A.C. Milan, Medel played as centre-back for 37 minutes before replaced by Jeison Murillo due to a knee injury. Following the match, which ended in a 2–2 draw, it was confirmed that Medel had damaged his lateral meniscus and would be sidelined until January 2017.

Medel returned to action on 28 January by playing in Inter's 3–0 home defeat of Pescara. Later on 12 March, he made his 100th appearance for Inter as the Nerazzurri beat Atalanta 7–1 at home.

Beşiktaş
On 11 August 2017, Medel signed for Süper Lig champions Beşiktaş for a reported €3 million. He signed a three-year contract.

Bologna
On 29 August 2019, Medel signed a three-year contract with Serie A club Bologna for a reported fee of €2.5 million. He debuted for Bologna against rivals SPAL on 30 August 2019.

International career

U20 and early senior career
In March 2007, Medel made his international debut for Chile in a friendly against Argentina. Later that year, he played a key role in Chile's third-place finish in the U-20 World Cup held in Canada. He was sent off in the semi-final match against Argentina, when he kicked Gabriel Mercado in the 24th minute and was suspended for the third-place play-off. Medel claimed that he was tasered by police after the match.

He made his competitive debut for Chile in the 2010 FIFA World Cup qualification match against Bolivia in a 2–0 victory at the Estadio Hernando Siles in La Paz, scoring both goals, the first being a bicycle kick. Medel played an important role in Chile's qualification for the 2010 FIFA World Cup, playing as a central defender or right back. He started in the three group-stage matches at the World Cup finals in South Africa, but was suspended for the round of 16 match against Brazil, where la Roja were eliminated.

He was named in Chile's squad for the 2011 Copa América, featuring in all three group matches, the first two as a starter. In the quarter-final match against Venezuela in San Juan, Argentina, he was sent off for handball and Chile lost 2–1.

2014 World Cup

Medel played a key role in 2014 FIFA World Cup qualification, scoring the goal that secured qualification for the 2014 FIFA World Cup, heading a goal against Ecuador. Medel captained Chile in a 1–0 friendly defeat to Germany on 5 March 2014. He was one of 23 players who were called up by coach Jorge Sampaoli to play in 2014 FIFA World Cup in Brazil. Medel played as a starter alongside Gonzalo Jara in the center of defense, for Chile who beat Australia 3–1 in Cuiabá to get their first three points of the World Cup campaign. He also played a full 90 minutes in second match against the reigning world champions Spain, with Chile getting a historic 2–0 win. Spain's loss sealed the qualification of both Chile and the Netherlands to the knockout stage, and eliminated both Spain and Australia. Spain became the fifth defending champion to be knocked out in the group stage. Medel played 90 minutes in the final group match against the Netherlands who won 2–0 and won the group, while Chile finished Group B as runner-up with six points. Chile was eliminated in the round of 16 against the same team that eliminated them in last tournament, Brazil, but this time, Brazil advanced to the quarter-finals by winning on penalty shootout.

2015 Copa América
At the 2015 Copa América, held in Chile, Medel scored during a 5–0 win against Bolivia which ensured that La Roja would progress to the knockout stage as Group A winners. In the semi-final against Peru, he scored an own goal from Luis Advíncula's cross to equalise, but Chile advanced to the final winning 2–1. In the final against Argentina, Medel played as a starter and helped the team to win the trophy on penalty kicks, after the regular time ended in a goalless draw. Medel became the fourth most capped player with 80 matches, equaling his defense partner Gonzalo Jara. That was Medel's first major trophy with Chile. For his performances he was named in the Team of the tournament.

2017 FIFA Confederations Cup
In June 2017, Medel was named in the 2017 FIFA Confederations Cup squad in Chile's first ever participation. On 13 June, in the friendly against Romania, Medel received a red-card in 33rd minute as Chile slumped into a 3–2 away defeat. It was his fourth red-card with the national team in 99 appearances. He captained Chile in the first two Group B matches against Cameroon and Germany due to Claudio Bravo's injury, also earning his 100th cap in the process, becoming the fourth Chile player to achieve the feat. Then he was rested for the final group match as Chile achieved a second-place which allowed them to go to knockout stage.

2019 Copa América
In the third-place match of the 2019 Copa América against Argentina on 6 July, Medel was sent off along with Lionel Messi in the 37th minute of play, after being involved in an altercation with the Argentine; Chile lost the match 2–1.

Style of play
Medel usually plays as a defensive midfielder; however, he is also capable of playing as a defender, and has even been deployed as a centre-back throughout his career, as well as in other midfield roles, or even as a right-back. Due to his work-rate, physicality, tenacity, tactical intelligence, and his aggressive, hard-tackling style of play, as well as his leadership on the pitch, he is nicknamed Pitbull. In 2015, manager Roberto Mancini described Medel as a warrior.

Career statistics

Club

International

Scores and results list Chile's goal tally first.

Honours

International
Chile
 Copa América: 2015, 2016

Individual
 Chilean Footballer of the Year: 2008
 Universidad Católica Footballer of the year: 2008
 Team of Copa Libertadores : 2008
 Team of year in South America: 2009
 Copa América Team of the Tournament: 2015, 2016

See also
List of footballers with 100 or more caps

References

External links

 
 
 2010 FIFA World Cup profile
 

1987 births
Living people
Footballers from Santiago
Chilean footballers
Association football midfielders
Club Deportivo Universidad Católica footballers
Boca Juniors footballers
Sevilla FC players
Cardiff City F.C. players
Inter Milan players
Beşiktaş J.K. footballers
Bologna F.C. 1909 players
Chilean Primera División players
Argentine Primera División players
La Liga players
Premier League players
Serie A players
Süper Lig players
Chile under-20 international footballers
Chile international footballers
2010 FIFA World Cup players
2011 Copa América players
2014 FIFA World Cup players
2015 Copa América players
Copa América Centenario players
2017 FIFA Confederations Cup players
2019 Copa América players
2021 Copa América players
Copa América-winning players
FIFA Century Club
Chilean expatriate footballers
Chilean expatriate sportspeople in Argentina
Chilean expatriate sportspeople in Spain
Chilean expatriate sportspeople in Wales
Chilean expatriate sportspeople in Italy
Chilean expatriate sportspeople in Turkey
Expatriate footballers in Argentina
Expatriate footballers in Spain
Expatriate footballers in Wales
Expatriate footballers in Italy
Expatriate footballers in Turkey